Bentley is a locality in the Northern Rivers region of New South Wales, Australia. In , Bentley had a population of 225 people.

Notes

Towns in New South Wales
Northern Rivers
City of Lismore